The Irish League in season 1900–01 comprised 6 teams, and Distillery won the championship.

League standings

Results

References
Northern Ireland - List of final tables (RSSSF)

1900-01
Ireland
Irish